Morweena is a small community in Manitoba of approximately 150 people. It is north of Winnipeg, accessible from Highway 7, in the Rural Municipality of Bifrost.

A notable person from Morweena is James Reimer, a goaltender with the San Jose Sharks in the National Hockey League.

References

Unincorporated communities in Interlake Region, Manitoba